The year 633 BC was a year of the pre-Julian Roman calendar. In the Roman Empire, it was known as year 121 Ab urbe condita . The denomination 633 BC for this year has been used since the early medieval period, when the Anno Domini calendar era became the prevalent method in Europe for naming years.

Events

Births
 Jehoahaz, king of Judah

Deaths
 Phraortes, second king of the Medes
 Duke Xiao of Qi, ruler of the state of Qi

References